Eushelfordia pica is a species of cockroach in the family Ectobiidae.

References

    

Cockroaches
Insects described in 1868